Gloria Schoemann (1910–2006) was a Mexican film editor. Schoemann was very prolific, working on more than two hundred films during her career.

Selected filmography
 Another Dawn (1943)
 Cantaclaro (1946)
 Gran Casino (1946)
 The Associate (1946)
 Enamorada (1946)
 Flor de caña (1948)
 The Unloved Woman (1949)
 Lola Casanova (1949)
 Immaculate (1950)
 Maria Islands (1951)
 Captain Scarlett (1953)
 Arm in Arm Down the Street (1956)
 Where the Circle Ends (1956)
 The Boxer (1958)

References

Bibliography
 Edwards, Gwynne. A Companion to Luis Buñuel. Tamesis Books, 2005.

External links

1910 births
2006 deaths
Mexican film editors
People from Mexico City
Mexican people of German descent

Women film editors